Atul Kumar may refer to:
 Atul Kumar (chemist), Indian organic chemist
 Atul Kumar (ophthalmologist), Indian ophthalmologist, Padma Shri awardee